Hamburg Aerodrome  was located in the Hamburg area, on the Chinchaga Forestry Road in north-western Alberta, Canada.

The airport was built and owned by Apache Canada Corporation but was later maintained and operated by Canadian Natural Resources Limited.

The Hamburg Open Camp (providing lodging and auto fuel) is located just north of the airstrip.

References

Defunct airports in Alberta
Clear Hills County